Fotbollskanalen Europa is a Swedish TV-program on football which is focused on the big leagues in Europe. The program is broadcast on Sundays on TV4 and led by Patrick Ekwall. The program also has a Facebook page with over 50,000 members. In 2010 the program lost their rights to show Premier League.

External links
 Homepage
 Fotbollskanalen Europa on Facebook

Sports television in Sweden